Zamig Athakishiyev is an Azerbaijani-Turkish kickboxer.

Titles
2011 WBKF European title (91 kg) champion
2010 RMO Istanbul tournament champion
2010 Wako European (91 kg k-1) finalist

Kickboxing record

See also
 List of heavyweight boxing champions
 List of male kickboxers

References

External links
K-1 World Grand Prix Selection 2010

1986 births
Living people
Azerbaijani male kickboxers
Turkish male kickboxers
Heavyweight kickboxers
Azerbaijani Muay Thai practitioners
Turkish Muay Thai practitioners
SUPERKOMBAT kickboxers